An issue tracking system (also ITS, trouble ticket system, support ticket, request management or incident ticket system) is a computer software package that manages and maintains lists of issues. Issue tracking systems are generally used in collaborative settings, especially in large or distributed collaborations, but can also be employed by individuals as part of a time management or personal productivity regimen. These systems often encompass resource allocation, time accounting, priority management, and oversight workflow in addition to implementing a centralized issue registry.

Background 
In the institutional setting, issue tracking systems are commonly used in an organization's customer support call center to create, update, and resolve reported customer issues, or even issues reported by that organization's other employees. A support ticket should include vital information for the account involved and the issue encountered. An issue tracking system often also contains a knowledge base containing information on each customer, resolutions to common problems, and other such data. 

An issue tracking system is similar to a "bugtracker", and often, a software company will sell both, and some bugtrackers are capable of being used as an issue tracking system, and vice versa. Consistent use of an issue or bug tracking system is considered one of the "hallmarks of a good software team". 
A ticket element, within an issue tracking system, is a running report on a particular problem, its status, and other relevant data. They are commonly created in a help desk or call center environment and almost always have a unique reference number, also known as a case, issue or call log number which is used to allow the user or help staff to quickly locate, add to or communicate the status of the user's issue or request.

These tickets are called so because of their origin as small cards within a traditional wall mounted work planning system when this kind of support started. Operators or staff receiving a call or query from a user would fill out a small card with the user's details and a brief summary of the request and place it into a position (usually the last) in a column of pending slots for an appropriate engineer, so determining the staff member who would deal with the query and the priority of the request.

The shared conceptual foundation between issue tracking systems and bugtrackers is that a valid issue must be amenable to a decisive resolution (such as "completed", "fixed", or a group consensus that the issue is not worth solving, such as "not a problem" or "won't fix"); that each issue is unique (duplicate problem reports are in most cases promptly amalgamated into a single active issue or ticket); and—beyond the screening stage—that there is precisely one person assigned formal responsibility to move the issue forward (this formal baton will often bounce around many times as the issue evolves). In bug trackers, issues are generally quality or feature related with respect to a codebase (which is inherently a project management setting) whereas in generalized issue tracking systems, the tickets are often service-related or relationship-based, with closer ties to customer relationship management (CRM) concerns.

Issues

Issues can have several aspects to them. Each issue in the system may have an urgency value assigned to it, based on the overall importance of that issue. Low or zero urgency issues are minor and should be resolved as time permits.
Other details of issues include the customer experiencing the issue (whether external or internal), date of submission, detailed descriptions of the problem being experienced, attempted solutions or workarounds, and other relevant information. Each issue maintains a history of each change.

Functions
Issue-tracking systems fulfill different functions, in particular:
 Entering of dysfunctions, errors and requests (e.g. manually or by e-mail Response Management Systems)
 Distribution and assignment of issues to persons in charge
 Monitoring of handling, time spent and quality of work
 Ensuring the observation of internal processes by forced control with help of workflows
 Statistical analysis of the number of tickets
 Automatic generation of tickets by alarming systems, e.g. network monitoring
 Fulfillment of external service agreements (Service Level Agreement, SLA)
 Systematic collection of questions and answers for FAQs
 Assignment of a priority to each issue based on the overall importance of that issue, the customer, date of submission, SLA
 Containing a detailed descriptions of the problem being experienced, attempted solutions or workarounds, and other relevant information
 Maintaining of a history of each change

Workflow
An example scenario is presented to demonstrate how a common issue tracking system would work:

 A customer service technician receives a telephone call, email, or other communication from a customer about a problem. Some applications provide built-in messaging system and automatic error reporting from exception handling blocks.
 The technician verifies that the problem is real, and not just perceived. The technician will also ensure that enough information about the problem is obtained from the customer. This information generally includes the environment of the customer, when and how the issue occurs, and all other relevant circumstances.
 The technician creates the issue in the system, entering all relevant data, as provided by the customer.
 As work is done on that issue, the system is updated with new data by the technician. Any attempt at fixing the problem should be noted in the issue system. Ticket status most likely will be changed from open to pending.
 After the issue has been fully addressed, it is marked as resolved in the issue tracking system.

If the problem is not fully resolved, the ticket will be reopened once the technician receives new information from the customer.
A Run Book Automation process that implements best practices for these workflows and increases IT personnel effectiveness is becoming very common.

Use in different sectors

Government

Some government services use issue tracking system to keep track of issues and display them to the public. Issue tracking systems may show all tasks still to be done by the government (in a waiting queue), finished tasks, tasks in progress, order sequence, etc. Finished tasks can also be foreseen with the report, showing what exactly has been done on the issue.

Issue tracking systems are for instance used to track which legislative bills are up for voting and the outcome of them.

Transport and infrastructure issues (i.e. obstructions on roads, complains, ...) can also be filed using issue tracking systems. The issues can then be tackled by the relevant government services.

See also
 Help desk software
 Comparison of help desk issue tracking software
 Comparison of issue-tracking systems
 Climate Action Tracker
 Government by algorithm
 Issue log
 National Priorities List
 Suggestion box
 Open-source software development
 Prioritization
 Resource allocation
 User innovation

References

External links
  : This category has a misleading name as it lists both bug and issue tracking systems.
  : Helpdesk & issue tracking software at DMOZ
  : This category lists issue tracking systems developed in Java.

Business software